Beaver Dam Lake is a census-designated place (CDP) in the towns of New Windsor, Blooming Grove, and Cornwall in Orange County, New York, United States. As of the 2020 census, it had a population of 2,609.

The CDP is in eastern Orange County, bordered to the west by the village of Washingtonville and to the south by Salisbury Mills. The community surrounds Beaverdam Lake, which drains south to Moodna Creek at Salisbury Mills. Moodna Creek flows into the Hudson River between New Windsor and Cornwall-on-Hudson.

New York State Route 94 forms the southern edge of the CDP. It leads northeast  to New Windsor and southwest  to Chester.

Demographics
As of the census of 2020, there were 2,609 people residing in the area.

Geography

References 

Census-designated places in Orange County, New York
Census-designated places in New York (state)